A magic carpet is a mythological flying (or "teleporting") rug.

Magic carpet may also refer to:

Film, video, music and print media
 The Magic Carpet, 1930s pulp magazine originally called Oriental Stories
 IMAX Magic Carpet, large format film system in 1990
 Magic Carpet (Aladdin), silent character featured in 1992 Disney film Aladdin and its franchise
 Magic Carpet (video game), 1994 first person shooter  game from Bullfrog Productions
 Early form of "Extreme Gear" (type of racing vehicle) in the 2006 video game, Sonic Riders
 "Magic Carpet" (song), 1963 song by English performer Billy J. Kramer
 Magic Carpet (band), English psychedelic folk band during 1970s
 The Magic Carpet (film), a 1951 American adventure film

Military operations
 Magic Carpet, slang term for Malta convoy supply runs from Alexandria to Malta by British submarines during the Siege of Malta during World War II
 Operation Magic Carpet, post-World War II U.S. Navy military operation
 Operation Magic Carpet (Yemen), joint effort by UK and U.S. to airlift Yemeni Jews to Israel 1949–50

Transportation
 Magic carpet (ski lift), type of surface lift found at ski areas
 Cessna Experimental Magic Carpet, light aircraft research project

See also
 Magic Carpet Ride (disambiguation)